Valley City is an unincorporated community in Washington Township, Harrison County, Indiana.

History
Valley City was platted in 1859. It was named for the valley in which it situated. A post office was established at Valley City in 1863, and remained in operation until it was discontinued in 1911.

Geography
The community is situated near the head of Blue Spring Hollow, east of New Amsterdam and north of Mauckport.

References

Unincorporated communities in Harrison County, Indiana
Unincorporated communities in Indiana
Louisville metropolitan area